Fred Mundy (born 5 January 1941) is a former Australian rules footballer who played with Geelong and Richmond in the Victorian Football League (VFL).

Mundy, who played as a ruck-rover and in defence, came to Geelong from Orbost in 1959 and made four league appearances that year. At the beginning of the 1960 season, Mundy was cleared to Richmond. Mundy debuted for Richmond in round four, the first of four successive games that he would play, before he received a two-week suspension, for striking Footscray's Trevor Elliott. He played only two more games that season.

In 1961, Mundy had to return home to manage the family farm in Orbost, as his father had been severely injured in an accident.

References

External links

1941 births
Australian rules footballers from Victoria (Australia)
Geelong Football Club players
Richmond Football Club players
Living people